Holy Rood Catholic Church is a Roman Catholic Church located on King Street in Market Rasen, Lincolnshire, England.

Elton John's lyric writing partner and longtime friend Bernie Taupin attended there.

See also
Rood

Roman Catholic churches in Lincolnshire
Market Rasen